The North American section of the 2023 FIVB Volleyball Men's Challenger Cup qualification acted as a qualifier for the 2023 FIVB Volleyball Men's Challenger Cup, for national teams which are members of the North, Central America and Caribbean Volleyball Confederation (NORCECA). The tournament was held in Pinar del Río, Cuba from 3 to 5 June 2022. The winners Cuba qualified for the 2023 Challenger Cup. But, as Cuba later won the 2022 FIVB Volleyball Men's Challenger Cup and qualified for the 2023 FIVB Volleyball Men's Nations League, the runners-up Dominican Republic succeeded to the 2023 Challenger Cup qualification.

Qualification
The hosts Cuba and the top three ranked teams from the NORCECA Ranking as of 1 January 2022 not yet participating in the 2022 Nations League qualified for the tournament. Rankings are shown in brackets except the hosts who ranked 3rd.

 (Hosts)
 (4)
 (5)
 (6)

Venue
 Sala 19 de Noviembre, Pinar del Río, Cuba

Pool standing procedure
 Number of matches won
 Match points
 Sets ratio
 Points ratio
 Result of the last match between the tied teams

Match won 3–0: 5 match points for the winner, 0 match points for the loser
Match won 3–1: 4 match points for the winner, 1 match point for the loser
Match won 3–2: 3 match points for the winner, 2 match points for the loser

Round robin
All times are Cuba Daylight Time (UTC−04:00).

Final standing
{| class="wikitable" style="text-align:center"
|-
!width=40|Rank
!width=180|Team
|- bgcolor=#87ceeb
|1
|style="text-align:left"|
|- bgcolor=#ccffcc
|2
|style="text-align:left"|
|-
|3
|style="text-align:left"|
|-
|4
|style="text-align:left"|
|}

References

External links
2023 Challenger Cup North American Qualifier – official website
Regulations

FIVB
International volleyball competitions hosted by Cuba
FIVB Volleyball Men's Challenger Cup qualification